Hotel Dieu Hospital site is a hospital in Kingston, Ontario, Canada. It is affiliated with Queen's University, and is a partner within Kingston's university hospitals, delivering health care, conducting research and training the health care professionals.

History 
In 1841, the Catholic bishop of Kingston, Remigius Gaulin, asked the Religious Hospitallers of Saint Joseph (RHSJ) of Montreal to send a group of sisters to establish a Catholic Hospital in his city to provide care for the poor Irish Catholic immigrants in the city. The RHSJs, however, were unable to find suitable buildings for their hospital until 1845. On September 2, 1845, Mother Amable Bourbonniere along with Sisters Huguette Claire Latour, Emilie Barbarie, and Louise Davignon, accompanied by their benefactress, Miss Josephine Perras and Mr. Laframboise, a friend of the community, arrived in Kingston. They stayed with the Kingston Notre Dame Sisters for two days, and then moved into their hospital, located in a small limestone building, now 229 Brock Street, on September 4, 1845. The Kingston RHSJs saw their first patient on September 7. By the end of October, they had refurbished and moved into their monastery, located at 233 Brock Street, allowing them to have a men's ward on the main floor of the hospital and a women's ward on the second floor.

The hospital was in operation when the city suffered an epidemic of typhus in 1847. In addition to ill and dying patients, Hotel Dieu cared for 100 orphaned children who had lost their parents. The disease had accompanied poor Irish immigrants fleeing the famine in their homeland. No one yet understood how the disease spread, and poor sanitation practices compounded the epidemic.

In 1892, the hospital was moved to its present location on Sydenham Street, which formerly housed Regiopolis College. In 1846, Alexander Macdonell (bishop) established Regiopolis College, which offered academic and theological training to Roman Catholic youth. The original college building is now the Sydenham Wing of the Hotel Dieu Hospital.

The main wing of the Hotel Dieu Hospital, the Jeanne Mance Wing, completed in 1984, is named for a woman sent by the RHSJ to New France in 1641. Jeanne Mance, a lay woman, was given the responsibility of founding a hospital and caring for the sick in New France. In 1642, she arrived in what is now Montreal and founded the first Hotel Dieu Hospital in 1645.

Services

Urgent Care Centre 
The hospital's Urgent Care Centre is meant for people with injuries or illnesses that are non-life-threatening. All patients who are ambulatory and who are experiencing minor illness or injuries that cannot wait for a family doctor are directed to attend this clinic. The Urgent Care Centre is open from 8 a.m. – 8 p.m., 365 days/year.

Clinics 
Outpatient pediatrics
Cardiology
Ophthalmology
diabetes education
breast assessment
Day surgery
Urgent care and mental health programs

St. Joseph's School of Nursing

 In 1912 the Religious Hospitallers of St. Joseph established a nursing school in Kingston at Hotel Dieu Hospital. This became necessary as Sisters could no longer care for the increasing number of patients at the hospital. Training, which was initially provided by nursing Sisters and doctors at the hospital, ended with the graduate earning a three-year diploma. It became a two-year program in 1970 The first class graduated in 1914 and the final class was the Class of 1974. In total, 1695 nurses graduated from the school The school was closed in 1973 as all hospital-based diploma nursing programs in Ontario were transferred to Colleges of Applied Arts and Technology. The Class of 1974 spent their first year at the Hotel Dieu and their second at St. Lawrence College.

Notable graduates

 Marion Dewar, public health nurse, later Mayor of Ottawa and federal Member of Parliament.

See also 
Kingston General Hospital site
Providence Continuing Care Centre (PCCC)

References

External links
Hotel Dieu Hospital - Official web site.

Brutalist architecture in Canada
Teaching hospitals in Canada
Hospitals in Ontario
Hospital buildings completed in 1892
Hospital buildings completed in 1894
Buildings and structures in Kingston, Ontario
Hospitals established in 1845
Hotel Dieu Hospital (Kingston, Ontario)#St. Joseph's School of Nursing
Hotel Dieu Hospital (Kingston, Ontario)#St. Joseph's School of Nursing